Shaheen Public Secondary School Handwara, commonly known as SPSS Handwara, is an academic and professional Private School in Handwara town of Jammu and Kashmir's Kupwara district. It is one of the oldest institutions of secondary education in Handwara. It has been upgraded to Secondary Level in 2008. It was established in 2002 and is recognised by J&K Board Of School Education.

History 
The school was founded on 13 March 2002 by Pirzada Shabir Ahmad. It is a private secondary school. It is recognised by J&K Board Of School Education vide renewed registration order no. 131- Aff of 2018 dated 15-10-2018. It has been upgraded to Secondary Level in 2008. It is located in Handwara, Kupwar, Jammu and Kashmir.

Notable alumni 

 Mohammad Kaamil Pirzada - Managing director, marketing & SEO

References 

Private schools in Jammu and Kashmir
Educational institutions established in 2002
Schools in Jammu and Kashmir
Kupwara district
2002 establishments in Jammu and Kashmir